The 1980 United States presidential election in Arkansas took place on November 4, 1980. All fifty states and The District of Columbia were part of the 1980 United States presidential election. State voters chose six electors to the Electoral College, who voted for president and vice president.

The election was very close in Arkansas, with the state being won by former California Governor Ronald Reagan (R) by only 0.6 points.

Despite incumbent Jimmy Carter having won the state four years earlier by 30 percent, Carter's perceived failures in office, including economic downturn in an election year, the Iran hostage crisis, and a riot by Cuban refugees who were temporarily placed in Fort Chaffee in western Arkansas, contributed to his defeat. While insignificant in the overall context of Reagan winning the Electoral College by a significant amount, some analysts have said the combined Democratic ticket in Arkansas in both the presidential and gubernatorial races would have won, if the riot had not occurred.

Results

Results by county

See also
 United States presidential elections in Arkansas
 Presidency of Ronald Reagan

References

Arkansas
1980
1980 Arkansas elections